The 2000 NAIA football season was the component of the 2000 college football season organized by the National Association of Intercollegiate Athletics (NAIA) in the United States. The season's playoffs, known as the NAIA Football National Championship, culminated with the championship game on December 16, at Jim Carroll Stadium in Savannah, Tennessee.

Conference and membership changes

Conference changes
 This was the first season for the Dakota Athletic Conference. The DAC was formed by former members of the newly-disbanded North Dakota College Athletic and South Dakota-Iowa Intercollegiate conferences from North Dakota and South Dakota.
 This was also the first season for the Great Plains Athletic Conference, which rebranded from the Nebraska-Iowa Athletic Conference after adding four former members of the South Dakota-Iowa Intercollegiate Conference from South Dakota and Iowa.

Membership changes

Conference standings

Postseason

Rankings

References